Velindastus discrepans is a species of beetle in the family Carabidae, the only species in the genus Velindastus.

References

Lebiinae